The list of teams and cyclists in the 2008 Tour de France contains the professional road bicycle racers who will compete at the 2008 Tour de France from July 5 to July 27, 2008. Of the 18 UCI ProTour teams, only Astana was not invited. Additionally, Agritubel, Barloworld and Slipstream–Chipotle were given entries. The 20 teams invited to the race will enter a team of nine riders each, which will make up a total of 180 riders. The riders hail from 28 countries, with France (40), Spain (30) and Italy (21) having the highest representation.

Teams 
On July 1, the Tour de France announced the provisional start list for the 2008 Tour de France. Among the notable absentees were:
the Astana Team, which includes two of the top three from the 2007 race, Alberto Contador and Levi Leipheimer, and Andreas Klöden, 2nd in the 2006 race.
 José Ángel Gómez Marchante, who would have been expected to be team leader for Saunier Duval–Scott, due to ill health.
 Thomas Dekker of Rabobank, dropped due to his poor performance in earlier 2008 races.
  Liquigas sprinter Daniele Bennati due to a persistent Achilles tendon problem.
 Tom Boonen of Quick Step, 2007 points classification winner, who was barred by the race organizers due to an out-of-competition positive cocaine test.

Age as of the start of race, 2008-07-05. 

†: Riders eligible for the Young Riders' competition, with birthdays on or after 1 January 1983.

Summary of the field
 Euskaltel is the only team whose riders are all from one country (Spain); Teams CSC Saxo Bank and Columbia each represent eight nations among their nine riders.
 Óscar Pereiro is the only previous Tour winner, having won in 2006.
 Two other riders have won a Grand Tour race:  Denis Menchov (Vuelta a España in 2005 and 2007) and Damiano Cunego (Giro d'Italia in 2004).
 Four riders have won the green jersey in previous Tours:  Erik Zabel (six times), Robbie McEwen (three times), Baden Cooke and Thor Hushovd (once each).
 Only Mauricio Soler has previously won the Tour's King of the Mountains competition, in 2007.
 Three riders have won the maillot blanc:  Menchov, Cunego and Yaroslav Popovych.
 33 riders have won a Tour de France stage, and 13 have worn the yellow jersey.
 The youngest rider is Gerald Ciolek, at 21, and 38-year-old Stéphane Goubert is the eldest.
 Six riders in the field went on to win one or more Grand Tours, Cadel Evans, Andy Schleck, Alejandro Valverde, Chris Froome, Vincenzo Nibali and Juan José Cobo.

References

2008 Tour de France
2008